The residents' committee, shortened as juweihui or juwei in Chinese, also translated as neighborhood committee, residents' association, residential committee, is a grassroots mass autonomous organization for self-management, self-education and self-service for residents in Mainland China.

The status of a residents' committee is equivalent to that of a villagers' committee in the countryside, both of which do not belong to the state organs.

On 23 October 1949, the representatives of the residents of Shangyangshi Street, Shangcheng District, Hangzhou, Zhejiang, elected the first residents' committee of the People's Republic of China, the Shangyangshi Street Residents' Committee.

See also

Villagers' committee

References

Self-governance
Political organizations